Peer is a city and municipality located in the province of Limburg, Flemish Region, Belgium. On January 1, 2006, Peer had a total population of 15,810. The total area is 86.95 km² which gives a population density of 182 inhabitants per km².

The municipality consists of the following sub-municipalities: Peer, Grote-Brogel, Kleine-Brogel, Wauberg, Erpekom and Wijchmaal.

Peer is the site of a famous annual blues music festival held in July.

History
Peer is the birth place of the composer Armand Preud'homme. From 1990 to 2018 the Armand Preud'homme Museum remembered to his life and work.

The village Grote Brogel, part of Peer, claims to be the birthplace of Pieter Bruegel. The Bruegel Foundation was also founded in Peer to research the history of Peer and Pieter Bruegel.

Kleine Brogel, a village that is a part of Peer, includes Kleine Brogel Air Base. Rumours that American nuclear weapons under the NATO nuclear sharing program were stationed at Kleine Brogel have never been confirmed.

Climate

Peer has in the summer quite a nice temperature, around 20 degrees Celsius. In the winter it normally snows.

References

External links
 

Municipalities of Limburg (Belgium)